"That's When" is a song recorded by American singer-songwriter Taylor Swift featuring New Zealand-born Australian country singer Keith Urban. The song is the 24th track on Swift's first re-recorded album, Fearless (Taylor's Version) (2021), a re-recording of her 2008 album Fearless. It is one of six "from the Vault" tracks that were written for the original album but were scrapped. Swift wrote the song with the Warren Brothers in 2006 and produced it with Jack Antonoff in 2021. 

"That's When" is a country pop song narrating the aftermath of a broken relationship, with the lovers introspecting on how to reunite with one another. It received positive reviews from music critics, who favored the production and Urban's presence on the song. Commercially, the song reached number 30 on the U.S. Hot Country Songs chart, number 76 on the Rolling Stone Top 100, number 63 in Canada, and number 81 in Australia.

Background and release
On February 11, 2021, following the dispute regarding the rights to the masters of her first six studio albums, Taylor Swift announced that the first of her re-recorded albums, Fearless (Taylor's Version), a re-recording of Swift's 2008 album Fearless, would be released on April 9, 2021. Alongside the announcement, Swift revealed she would release six songs, all dubbed "from the Vault" that did not make the 2008 album. Swift explained several reasons for the scrapping of the vault tracks, including not wanting too many breakup or down-tempo songs on the album, and the limitations of how many songs could fit on CDs in 2008. In her announcement of the album, Swift wrote "I've decided I want you to have the whole story. See the entire vivid picture, and let you into the entire dreamscape that is my Fearless album." Swift originally wrote "That's When" with The Warren Brothers, a country music duo composed of Brad and Brett Warren, in 2006, when she was a teenager and co-writing many of her songs in Nashville. Swift contacted The Warren Brothers again before the release of Fearless (Taylor's Version); they stated that fifteen years is the longest they've ever had a song on hold. A solo demo of "That's When" was leaked around 2014.

"That's When" marks Swift's second collaboration with Urban, after Tim McGraw's 2012 single "Highway Don't Care". Swift was the opening act during Urban's 2009 Escape Together World Tour. When initially looking back through her unreleased songs, Swift believed the song would work better as a duet and could only imagine Urban as the duet partner. Urban told Ellen DeGeneres in an interview that he was doing his Christmas shopping when Swift texted him requesting he contribute to "That's When" and "We Were Happy," another vault track: "I’m sitting in the food court at the shopping centre listening to these two unreleased Taylor Swift songs. [...] It was an unusual place to be hearing unreleased Taylor Swift music but I love the songs and luckily got to put a vocal on both of those."

On April 2, Swift uploaded a cryptic, golden-hued video to her social media accounts depicting a vault releasing scrambled words from it. Fans and new outlets decoded the scrambled letters to reveal the titles of the vault tracks. Swift uploaded the official track list to her social media accounts, including the names of the five remaining "from the Vault" tracks, the next day. Fearless (Taylor's Version) was released on April 9, 2021. Lyric videos of each song on the album were released to Swift's YouTube channel; "That's When" has since garnered over 2.5 million views as of July 2021. In the video, the lyrics appear over a foggy, rural landscape. "That's When" was also included in Fearless (Taylor's Version): The From the Vault Chapter, a streaming compilation released by Swift on May 26, 2021, alongside the five other vault songs from Fearless (Taylor's Version).

Composition and lyrics

Swift originally penned "That's When" with Brett and Brad Warren, members of country music duo The Warren Brothers, in 2006. Swift and Jack Antonoff produced the song; Antonoff collaborated with Swift on her last five studio albums, dating back to her 2014 album 1989, and produced three of the other vault tracks with Swift. "That's When" is a country pop track narrating the storyline of two former lovers contemplating reuniting and contemplating how to repair their relationship. Swift sings the first verse and Urban the second, with the two harmonizing during the chorus. The song is set in the key of F major with a tempo of 90 beats per minute (BPM). Swift and Urban's vocals span from F3 to B♭4.

Critical reception 
"That's When" received positive reviews from music critics, who acclaimed the collaboration between Swift and Urban. Saloni Gajjar of The A.V. Club wrote that the collaboration "hits all the right soothing notes." Writing for The Nash News, Jena Fowler wrote that "one of the best things Swift could've done [on Fearless (Taylor's Version)] was add country features", applauding the choruses where Swift and Urban harmonize. In a review of Fearless (Taylor's Version) published for Rolling Stone, Jonathan Bernstein opined that the song was one of the many vault tracks that were "revelatory glimpses into Swift's working process." Bernstein additionally highlighted the choice of Jack Antonoff as a producer on a song Swift wrote in 2006. Also writing for Rolling Stone, Joseph Hudak described "That's When" as "an introspective retelling of romance at the brink". Writing for Spin, Bobby Olivier designated "That's When" as an album highlight, describing it as a "hooky acoustic duet" that gives a glimpse into Swift's earlier career in country music. Hannah Mylrea of NME similarly designated the song as a highlight on Fearless (Taylor's Version), praising its "euphoric layered vocals" and Antonoff's 1989-style production. Poulomi Das also favorably compared the song's "sleek" production to that of 1989 in a review published in Firstpost.

Gigwise's Kelsey Barnes wrote that the song "fit[s] perfectly alongside [Swift's] other collaborations." Heather Taylor-Singh of Exclaim! selected "That's When" as exemplary of the vault tracks as "a fun treat for fans who can't get chose of Swift's vivid storytelling". Billboard's Jason Lipshutz opined that in spite of being a breakup song, "That's When" "offers a dose of levity". On the contrary, Jackson Langford of MTV ranked the song fifth of the six vault tracks, praising Urban's presence on the track but writing that the song "still falls just short of greatness." In a mixed review, Chris Willman of Variety wrote that "it's lovely to hear [Swift and Urban] together", but that the song doesn't feel sufficiently immersive in comparison to the other songs that made it to the original album. Willman commended Swift's decision to leave it off the original album, dubbing the song and its chords as "a slightly more balladic version of the superior 'You Belong with Me'". Jon Pareles similarly pointed out the similarities between the melodies of "That's When" and "You Belong with Me" in a New York Times critics roundtable.

Commercial performance 
Following the release of Fearless (Taylor's Version), "That's When" debuted at number 30 on the Billboard Hot Country Songs chart, one of 18 songs from the album to chart simultaneously. It additionally entered at 21 on the Country Streaming Songs chart (one of 12 songs from the album to chart) and 23 on the Country Digital Song Sales chart, each component charts for Hot Country Songs. Though it did not enter the Billboard Hot 100, it charted at number 3 on the Bubbling Under Hot 100 chart, a quasi-extension to the Hot 100. On the Rolling Stone Top 100 it debuted at number 76, alongside 11 other songs on the album, selling 44,100 units and garnering 5.1 million streams. Internationally, it charted at number 63 on the Canadian Hot 100 and 81 in Australia.

Credits and personnel
Credits adapted from Tidal.

 Taylor Swift – vocals, songwriting, production
 Keith Urban – vocals, 12-string acoustic guitar
 Brad Warren – songwriting
 Brett Warren – songwriting
 Jack Antonoff – production, acoustic guitar, bass, drums, electric guitar, record engineering, keyboards, percussion
 Mike Freedom Hart – bass, celesta, drums, electric guitar, Hammond B3, keyboards, pedal steel, piano
 Evan Smith — flute, saxophone
 John Rooney – assistant record engineering
 Jon Sher – assistant record engineering
 Sean Hutchinson – drums
 John Hanes – engineering
 Randy Merrill — master engineering
 Serban Ghenea — mixing
 Michael Riddleberger — percussion
 David Hart – record engineering
 Laura Sisk – record engineering
 Christopher Rowe – vocal engineering
 Nick Rowse – vocal engineering

Chart performance

Notes

References

2021 songs
Country ballads
Taylor Swift songs
Keith Urban songs
Songs written by Taylor Swift
Songs written by the Warren Brothers
Song recordings produced by Taylor Swift
Song recordings produced by Jack Antonoff
Male–female vocal duets